The tata of Koniakary is a tata built in the  commune of Koniakary,  from Kayes in Mali. It was constructed in 1855 at the initiative of El Hadj Oumar Tall. His goal was to defend against colonial troops.

Presentation

The tata, with its eight towers, was built in flat stone, which was quarried  from the site.

The French expedition to take Nioro du Sahel left after the destruction of the Koniakary tata by colonel Louis Archinard, June 15, 1890.

November , 2011 the Council of Ministers of Mali adopted a decree to classify the Koniakary tata as part of the national cultural patrimony of Mali.

The remains of the defensive wall are still visible today.

See also

 Toucouleur Empire

References

History of Mali
Architecture in Mali